Carl Theodor Auen (16 February 1892 – 23 June 1972) was a German film actor of the silent era. He appeared in more than 110 films between 1914 and 1938. Auen was a member of the Militant League for German Culture and also a member of the Advisory Council (Präsidialrat) of the president of the Reichsfilmkammer.

Selected filmography

 Die geheimnisvolle Villa (1914)
 The Dagger of Malaya (1919)
 The Panther Bride (1919)
 The Swabian Maiden (1919)
 The Howling Wolf (1919)
 The Sins of the Mother (1921)
 The Shadow of Gaby Leed (1921)
 The Diadem of the Czarina (1922)
 The Cigarette Countess (1922)
 The Unwritten Law (1922)
 Lyda Ssanin (1923)
 The Men of Sybill (1923)
 The Girl from Hell (1923)
 Set Me Free (1924)
 The Game of Love (1924)
 The Old Ballroom (1925)
 The Fire Dancer (1925)
 Golden Boy (1925)
 Ash Wednesday (1925)
 The Sea Cadet (1926)
 Annemarie and Her Cavalryman (1926)
 The Woman from the Folies Bergères (1927)
 On the Banks of the River Weser (1927)
 The Girl from Abroad (1927)
 The False Prince (1927)
 Tragedy at the Royal Circus (1928)
 Master and Mistress (1928)
 Only a Viennese Woman Kisses Like That (1928)
 Because I Love You (1928)
 Perjury (1929)
 Death Drive for the World Record (1929)
 Youth of the Big City (1929)
  The Customs Judge (1929)
 Lux, King of Criminals (1929)
 Archduke John (1929)
 Sin and Morality (1929)
 Distinguishing Features (1929)
 Affair at the Grand Hotel (1929)
 Big City Children (1929)
  The Man in the Dark (1930)
 Marshal Forwards (1932)
 Tannenberg (1932)
 The Invisible Front (1932)
 All is at Stake (1932)
 A Song Goes Round the World (1933)
 The Flower of Hawaii (1933)
 What Women Dream (1933)
 Little Man, What Now? (1933)
 The Country Schoolmaster (1933)
 Schlußakkord (1936) 
 Hilde and the Volkswagen (1936)
 Donogoo Tonka (1936)
 Orders Are Orders (1936)
 Savoy Hotel 217 (1936)
 Stronger Than Regulations (1936)
 Maria the Maid (1936)
 To New Shores (1937)
 The Glass Ball (1937)
 My Son the Minister (1937)
  Togger (1937)
 The Indian Tomb (1938)
 The Tiger of Eschnapur (1938)

References

External links

1892 births
1972 deaths
Actors from Düsseldorf
People from the Rhine Province
German male film actors
German male silent film actors
Militant League for German Culture members
20th-century German male actors